The Manggarai language is the language of the Manggarai people from the western parts of the island of Flores, in East Nusa Tenggara Province, Indonesia.

Background
Manggarai is the native language of the Manggarai people of Flores island in East Nusa Tenggara province, Indonesia. Based on statistical data reported by the Central Agency on Statistics (BPS) in 2009, it is the native language of more than 730,000 people in the province of East Nusa Tenggara, Indonesia.

Outside Flores, there was once a small minority of Manggarai-speaking people in the village of Manggarai located in the eastern part of Jakarta, the capital city of Indonesia. Formerly a neighbourhood in the capital with a large concentration of transmigrant workers from the Greater Manggarai region of Nusa Tenggara Timur, the neighbourhood's populace today from the said area has been decreasing (due to factors such as return to their ancestral village, intermarriage with different ethnic groups, etc.) for it is now populated by the majority native Betawi ethnic group.

The Manggarai language is part of the Austronesian family, and is therefore related to Indonesian and other Malay varieties. Most speakers of Manggarai also speak Indonesian for official and commercial purposes and to communicate with non-Manggarai Indonesians (including citizens of the same province from different diverse ethnic groups). Riung is often considered a dialect of Maranggai or a separate language.

Phonology

Consonants

Vowels

Citations

References

 
 
 
 

Sumba languages
Languages of Indonesia